KBIT-LD (channel 43) is a low-powered television station in Monterey, California, United States, affiliated with Telemax. It is owned by Major Market Broadcasting. and also serving Salinas and Santa Cruz. The station broadcasts from Fremont Peak and its studios are located in Watsonville.

Subchannels
The station's digital signal is multiplexed:

References

External links
Azteca TV 43 (KBIT)

BIT-LD
Watsonville, California
Television channels and stations established in 1980
BIT-LD
Low-power television stations in the United States